Lefort is a surname. Notable people with the surname include:

Cecily Margot Lefort, World War II heroine
Claude Lefort, political philosopher
Elizabeth Lefort (1914–2005), Canadian artist
Enzo Lefort, French foil fencer
Franz Lefort, Russian admiral
Sylvester Lefort, professional wrestler

See also
Lefort (ship), a Russian ship of the line
Le Fort (disambiguation)